The 1976 United States presidential election in Utah took place on November 2, 1976. All 50 states and the District of Columbia, were part of the 1976 United States presidential election. State voters chose four electors to the Electoral College, which selected the president and vice president of the United States.

Utah was won by incumbent Republican President Gerald Ford over the Democratic nominee, Jimmy Carter. Carter won the election nationally, and despite the election solidifying the state's place within the core of the Republican heartland (which it retains to this day) 1976 stands as the last occasion a Democrat has carried Emery County, where Carter obtained a fifty-four vote plurality. After Nixon’s clean sweep of all twenty-nine counties in 1972, Carter would also win Carbon County with 59.4 percent of the vote, but Ford won absolute majorities in all twenty-seven remaining counties, with his total vote ranging from 50.3 percent in Tooele County to 72.5 percent in Kane County. Ronald Reagan would repeat Nixon’s 1972 clean sweep in both his elections, and no county in Utah except Carbon and Tooele would ever vote against a Republican until 2008.

With 62.44 percent of the popular vote, Utah would prove to be Ford's strongest victory in the 1976 election.

Results

Results by county

See also
 United States presidential elections in Utah

References

Utah
1976
1976 Utah elections